Tsarichina is a village in western Bulgaria, located in Kostinbrod Municipality.

The Tsarichina Hole

The town became famous among the paranormal community in the early 1990s and was even nicknamed, "Bulgaria's Area 51" due to its famed Tsarichina Hole. The hole was dug by the Bulgarian Ministry of Defense, who excavated an area in the center of the village during a project which occurred from December 6, 1990, to November 19, 1992, initially in search of a purported hidden treasure of Tsar Samuil. The project was abandoned after two years due to “financial concerns” and the hole sealed with concrete.

A number of locals and foreign investigators reported the town had since become a hotspot for what they described as paranormal phenomena starting as soon as the digging began. Many have reported seeing strange lights and some UFOlogists claimed to have been hit with a, "beam of powerful light," over the course of their investigation. On top of that, during the two year dig more than one local claimed to have heard voices from a paranormal entity they associated with the hole. Famed clairvoyant Baba Vanga was even cited as reporting that a non-human entity existed in the hole during a visit to the village.

Conspiracy theorists' speculation about the event ranged widely, some citing rumors claiming the military excavated a triangular object of unknown origin. Many theorizing it was extraterrestrial or of protohuman origin.

The findings of a 2007 bTV documentary on the Tsarichina project, revealed that most of the military documents surrounding the event had disappeared from government archives or had since been destroyed.

Triumph is an upcoming film about the location.

References

Villages in Sofia Province